The 2015–16 FAW Welsh Cup is the 129th season of the annual knockout tournament for competitive football teams in Wales. The defending champions are The New Saints, having defeated Newtown 2-0 in the previous year's competition. The total prize money for 2015-16 was set at £158,000.

Both qualifying rounds and the first two rounds proper were regionalised, thereafter the draws were made nationwide.

First qualifying round

Northern Region 

|-

|}

Central Region 

|-

|}

Southern Region  

|-

|}

Quarter-final 
Prior the quarter finals there were two qualifying rounds and four rounds proper. Quarter final matches were played on Saturday 5 March 2016.

|-

|}

Semi-final 
Semi-final matches are to be played on Saturday 2 April 2016, both at Latham Park, Newtown, Powys.

|-

|}

Final

References

2015-16
2015–16 European domestic association football cups